The 2008 Bank Austria-TennisTrophy was a men's tennis tournament played on indoor hard courts. It was the 34th edition of the event known that year as the Bank Austria-TennisTrophy, and was part of the International Series Gold of the 2008 ATP Tour. It took place at the Wiener Stadthalle in Vienna, Austria, from October 6 through October 12, 2008.

The singles featured ATP No. 10, Rome Masters and Doha finalist, Beijing Olympics doubles gold medalist Stanislas Wawrinka, Beijing Olympics silver medalist, Viña del Mar and Munich winner Fernando González, and Stuttgart, Kitzbühel, Los Angeles, Washington champion, Tokyo finalist Juan Martín del Potro. Also present were Nottingham winner Ivo Karlović, Umag titlist Fernando Verdasco, Tommy Robredo, Gilles Simon and Gaël Monfils.

Finals

Singles

 Philipp Petzschner defeated  Gaël Monfils, 6–4, 6–4
It was Philipp Petzschner's 1st career title.

Doubles

 Max Mirnyi /  Andy Ram defeated  Philipp Petzschner /  Alexander Peya, 6–1, 7–5

References

External links
 Official website
 ATP tournament profile
 Singles draw
 Doubles draw